Nicole Gibbons is an American interior designer, television personality, founder of the startup Clare, and design blogger. She is best known as the founder of the decorating and lifestyle blog So Haute, and for her frequent television appearances. She currently appears as a design expert on Home Made Simple, a home improvement reality show on the Oprah Winfrey Network. She is also the founder of Nicole Gibbons Studio, LLC, which specializes in high-end residential and commercial interior design. She splits her time between New York and Los Angeles, California.

Gibbons describes her design aesthetic as "classic sophistication with a fresh, modern edge".

Early life and career

Gibbons was born in Detroit, Michigan, to William and Sondra Gibbons. She was raised in Southfield, Michigan, and attended nearby Mercy High School. Her mother worked as an interior designer, and her father was an entrepreneur. Gibbons credits her parents' influence as the foundation for her current success.

Gibbons attended Northwestern University in Evanston, Illinois and graduated with a Bachelor of Science degree in Communication Studies in 2003. She initially pursued a career in public relations and served for several years as the director of PR and events for Victoria's Secret.

Design career

Early design career
Although she never intended to pursue a career as a designer, Gibbons always maintained an interest in interior design. In January 2008, she launched her decorating and lifestyle blog, So Haute. So Haute serves as a "guide to stylish living" and shares design news, shopping resources, inspirational interiors, and decorating tips and ideas with its readers. In June 2008 Nicole established Nicole Gibbons Interiors, LLC, as a part-time design business focusing on small scale decorating projects in Manhattan.

Nicole Gibbons Studio
In early 2013, Gibbons re-launched her design firm as a full-time venture, renaming it Nicole Gibbons Studio. The firm has two branches: one specializes in full service design for residential and commercial clients, and the other focuses on Gibbons' branded partnerships and on-air work as a design expert in television and digital media.

Television appearances and other projects
In 2013, Gibbons joined the cast of the third season of Home Made Simple, a reality TV show hosted by the Oprah Winfrey Network, where she appears as a design expert. The show brings home improvement experts to help families redecorate a space in their home via cost-saving do-it-yourself techniques.
Gibbons is also an online contributor for Domino, a lifestyle magazine. She has been featured in multiple television, print and online publications, including HGTV, House Beautiful, TLC, InStyle, Real Simple, Better Homes & Gardens, The Nest, and Elle Décor. She has also collaborated with home and lifestyle brands including Target, One Kings Lane, and Pier 1 Imports.

References

External links
 Nicole Gibbons Official Website
 Nicole Gibbons Official Blog
 Nicole Gibbons on Twitter

Living people
American interior designers
Northwestern University School of Communication alumni
American women bloggers
American bloggers
American women interior designers
1981 births
21st-century American women